Looped is a Canadian animated television series created by the founders of Neptoon Studios, Todd Kauffman and Mark Thornton who also did Grojband for Teletoon. It first premiered in Canada on March 2, 2016 and was released on Amazon Prime Video in the United States. It also premiered on January 4, 2016 in Latin America on Cartoon Network and in the United Kingdom on CITV.

Plot
The series revolves around the life and adventures of Luc and Theo, two boys from the town of Port Doover who attend Port Doover Elementary School. Due to an accident in Theo's garage with an invention he created, the two boys are stuck in a time loop where every day is the same Monday, October 12. Since the events of that day are always the same, the two know exactly what will happen where and when. They use this knowledge as an opportunity to  do whatever they want at school and around their town, usually causing problems when their actions cause errors and other unusual events to occur in the time loop.

Characters

Main 
 Lucas "Luc" Maxwell (voiced by Mac Heywood in the pilot, Lyon Smith in episodes) – Theo's lazy and unintelligent best friend who uses the loop to indulge in endless mayhem with no regard for the consequences of his actions.
 Theodore "Theo" Merton Jr. (voiced by Bryn McAuley in the pilot, and Kevin Duhaney in episodes) – Luc's  nerdy and responsible best friend who has great knowledge of the loop and plays the straight man to Luc. In the episode “Monster Stink” he reveals that the time loop had lasted at least four years.

Classmates 
 Jesse (voiced by Scott Gorman) – The flatulent and short-tempered school bully. His fondness for picking on other children is contrasted with his proud vegetarianism and love of nature and animals.
 Gwyneth "Gwyn" Sanders (voiced by Denise Oliver) – A bespectacled, pink-haired girl who has strong romantic feelings for Luc but despises Theo and is unable to remember his name. Despite this, Luc is disgusted by her while Theo is infatuated with her.
 Sarah Doover (voiced by Alyson Court) – An extremely popular girl who never speaks and communicates entirely through texting on her cellphone. She only speaks in the series finale, where it is revealed that she was saving her voice for an upcoming talent show.
 Kelly and Kelli (voiced by Stephanie Lynn Robinson) (pronounced Kel-ee and Kel-iye) – Identical twin sisters who serve as Sarah's followers, issuing her commands and informing others of her moods, opinions, and actions.
 Kyle Bush (voiced by Adam Cawley) – An extremely handsome, compassionate, and popular boy in the school who is perfect and flawless in every way. Luc hates him for this, and is always trying to outdo him.
 Lester (voiced by Mark Edwards) – A nerd interested in video games and LARP. He is always stuffed inside his locker by Jesse, and then intentionally spends the entire day there to play video games.
 Amy (voiced by Stacey DePass) – A Goth girl who hides in the school basement.

Adults 
 Principal Applecrab (voiced by Darren Frost)  –  The frail and bespectacled principal of Port Doover  Elementary School. Luc and Theo often trick him into performing painful or humiliating actions at the school assembly for their amusement.
 Coach Lessard (voiced by Seán Cullen)  –  Luc and Theo's morbidly obese gym teacher who gets around on a golf cart. It is revealed in the episode "Badmerton to the Bone" that his left arm is bionic.
 Mr. LemonJello (voiced by Seán Cullen)  –  Luc and Theo's monotonous, apathetic science teacher.
 Theo Merton Sr. (voiced by Kevin Michael Richardson)  –  Theo's father. A former badminton champion who runs a sporting goods store.
 Claire (voiced by Athena Karkanis)  –  Luc's self-centered and incompetent teenage babysitter. As his parents are away on a three-day trip, she is Luc's guardian and has effectively replaced them due to the loop having started on the second day.
 Wilt Doover
Jerry Rivers

Episodes

Broadcast and release 
The series aired on Teletoon from March 2, 2016 to August 16, 2016. As of December 2016, the show no longer aired on Teletoon. It aired on Pop and Pop Max in the UK and in Africa. The series is available on Tubi in the United States. The show currently airs reruns on Nickelodeon Canada.

Looped has also been sold to Super RTL (Germany). Zoom (Israel), K2 (Italy), Gulli (France) and HBO Go (Poland).

Reception

The series received a mixed reception. Emily Ashby of Common Sense Media described the series a "time warp buddy comedy" which is "light on consequences." She also described the series as fast-faced, with physical violence, bathroom humor, and argued that it "falls short of meaningful entertainment for kids."

References

External links 
 Looped at DHX Media
 Looped at Teletoon
 Looped at IMDb

2010s Canadian animated television series
2010s Canadian comic science fiction television series
2016 Canadian television series debuts
2019 Canadian television series endings
Television series by Corus Entertainment
Television series by DHX Media
Canadian flash animated television series
Teletoon original programming
Canadian children's animated comic science fiction television series
Canadian children's animated science fantasy television series
Animated television series about children
Time loop television series
English-language television shows